The Riser Tour was the ninth headlining concert tour by American country music artist Dierks Bentley, in support of his seventh studio album Riser (2014).

The tour was first announced in January 2014 and began on May 9, 2014, in Charlotte, North Carolina, with the first leg ending on September 27, 2014, in Noblesville, Indiana. Chris Young, Chase Rice, and Jon Pardi served as opening acts.

About the tour, Bentley said, "This tour is the culmination of everything I've been working on for the past two years, both out on the road and in the studio recording 'Riser'". "I know my fans want a kick ass show, an affordable ticket and a  good parking lot scene to set the pregame going". "when it comes time for my set, I can promise that we are going big! I have never been more excited about a tour".

The second leg of the tour was announced on August 11, 2014, and began in October 2014, in Stockton, California. Randy Houser, Eric Paslay and Tim Hicks were the opening acts. Bentley said, "It's going to be tough to top this summer, but every night I get more excited and don't want this run to end. I'm just living in the moment as much as I can and taking it all in...it really has been the best summer of my life."

Opening acts
First leg
Chris Young
Chase Rice
Jon Pardi
Cassadee Pope
Neal McCoy (Camden only)

Second leg 
Randy Houser
Eric Paslay 
Tim Hicks
Eric Paslay
Randy Houser

Setlist

"5-1-5-0"
"Am I the Only One"
"Free and Easy (Down the Road I Go)"
"Tip It On Back"
"Feel That Fire"
"Every Mile a Memory"
"Lot of Leavin' Left to Do"
"Bourbon in Kentucky"
"Up on the Ridge"
"Counting Stars" (OneRepublic cover)
"Livin' on a Prayer (Bon Jovi cover) 
"Say You Do"
"Come a Little Closer"
"I Hold On"
"What Was I Thinkin'"
"Drunk on a Plane"
"Sideways"
"Home"

Tour dates

Notes
 This concert was a part of Delta Country Jam.
 This concert was a part of the WYCD Hoedown.
 This concert was a part of the WXTU 30th Anniversary Show.
 This concert was a part of CMA Music Festival. 
 This concert was a part of the B-93 Birthday Bash.
 This concert was a part of the Taste of Country Music Festival.
 This concert was a part of the WCOL Country Jam 2014.
 This concert was a part of OKC Festival.
 This concert was a part of Willie Nelson's 4 July Picnic.
 This concert was a part of the LaPorte County Fair.
 This concert was a part of the Craven Country Jamboree.
 This concert was a part of Country Jam USA.
 This concert was a part of the Cape Blanco Country Music Festival'.
 This concert was a part of the Erie County Fair.
 This concert was a part of the Havelock Country Jamboree.
 This concert was a part of Music in the Fields Festival.
 This concert was a part of Pepsi Gulf Coast Jam.
 This concert was a part of the Big Fresno Fair.
 This concert was a part of the Route 91 Harvest Festival'''.
 This concert is a part of "CBS Radio's The Night Before".

Box office score data

References

2014 concert tours
Dierks Bentley concert tours